Alessia Afi Dipol (born August 1, 1995) is an Italian-born naturalized Togolese alpine skier who competed for Togo at the Sochi 2014 Winter Olympics in the slalom and giant slalom. Dipol also originally competed for India between 2011 and 2013, but she later switched to compete for Togo even though she has no familial connections to the country, so she could qualify to compete at the 2014 Winter Olympics. She also chose to represent the country because her father owns a clothing factory in Togo.

Personal life 
Dipol was born in Pieve di Cadore, Belluno to Italian parents in the region of Veneto in Italy and lives with her family at San Vito di Cadore and attended Liceo Linguistico Europeo school at Auronzo di Cadore.

Dipol works as a ski instructor for the Italian ski club Scuola Sci Cortina.

Career

Italy 
Dipol started her youth career while registered with the Italian Winter Sports Federation between 2009 and 2010.

India 
Dipol joined the Winter Games Federation of India making her debut for India in 2011. She took part in FIS competitions and the Italian Championships representing India until 2013.

Togo 
Dipol decided to compete as part of Togo's first Winter Olympics team at the 2014 Winter Olympics at Sochi. Although she has no family ties to Togo, Dipol became a naturalized citizen in order to take part in the Winter Olympics.

Dipol on making her debut for the Togo national team:

On  February 18, Dipol finished the giant slalom race in 55th position out of 74 competitors who finished, with a total time of 3 minutes 2.80 seconds. She did not finish the slalom race after starting the first run. She carried the Togolese flag at the closing ceremony.

She also participated in 2015 FIS Alpine Ski Europa Cup and 2018 FIS Alpine Ski World Cup.

Alpine skiing results
All results are sourced from the International Ski Federation (FIS).

Olympic results

World Cup results

European Cup results

See also
Togo at the 2014 Winter Olympics

References

External links

1995 births
Living people
Sportspeople from the Province of Belluno
Italian female alpine skiers
Naturalized citizens of Togo
Togolese people of Italian descent
Togolese female alpine skiers
Olympic alpine skiers of Togo
Alpine skiers at the 2014 Winter Olympics
Indian female alpine skiers
Italian expatriates in India
21st-century Togolese people